Jean-Paul Maunick (born 19 February 1957, Mauritius), better known by his stage name Bluey is a British guitarist, bandleader, composer and record producer.  He has led the British acid jazz band Incognito since its formation in 1979.  With Incognito, he has released fifteen studio albums as well as a number of live albums, remix albums and compilation albums.  Prior to forming Incognito, Bluey was an original member of the group Light of the World.

His record production credits include artists such as Paul Weller, George Benson, Maxi Priest and Terry Callier; he has also collaborated with Stevie Wonder.

Maunick formed STR4TA with Gilles Peterson and released the album Aspects on Peterson’s Brownswood Recordings label in March 2021.

Solo career
He released his solo debut album Leap of Faith in March 2013.  Neil Kelly of PopMatters said of the album, "An undoubtedly listenable creation, Bluey has blended the club-infused soul-jazz sounds that made him famous with the sensibility of an elder statesman, which he is."

Personal life
He is the son of the Mauritian poet Edouard Maunick and Armande Mallet.  He was born in Mauritius, and moved to the United Kingdom when he was nine years old.

Discography

Studio albums

EP albums

Citrus Sun albums

Incognito albums
See Incognito discography

References

External links
Incognito official website

1957 births
Living people
Mauritian emigrants to the United Kingdom
Incognito (band) members